Kavi Uddheshichathu..? is a 2016 Indian Malayalam sports film directed by duo Thomas Kutty Naduvil and Liju Thomas. It features Asif Ali, Biju Menon,Narain and Saiju Kurup in lead roles along with Anju Kurian, Balu Varghese, Abhishek Raveendran, Ganapathy, Lena and Sija Rose in supporting roles. It is produced jointly by Asif Ali and Sajin Jaffer under the production Adam's World Of Imagination. The soundtrack and background score for the film are composed by Jakes Bijoy and Vinu Thomas. The film was released on 8 October 2016.

Plot
Allimoola is noted for its passionate volleyball supporters and a great former history of players that is now only a memory. During each year's volleyball event, the villagers place secret bets on which team will win. Because of an event in their school days, Kavalam Jimmy (Asif Ali) and Vattathil Bosco (Narain) are always at odds. In an impending yearly game, both of them stake their sisters for marriage. The entire community participates in the bet and organizes volleyball teams. Bosco employs Minnal Simon (Biju Menon), a pathological debtor with some early negligible experience in the sport, to coach Jimmy's team to failure. The police officer Jimmy had a fight with and was on bad terms with is the one Bosco chooses to lead his team. Bosco pays off Jimmy's university players in the finals, and Simon vows to demonstrate his integrity. Circumstances force Jimmy and his buddies to fill in for their squad, and they win the game using some methods from Simon's playbook. Bosco gets a hint from Jimmy's sister that she likes him and he is content. Jimmy ends up with Bosco's sister, with whom he had developed a sort of affection, while Simon departs with Jimmy's female sponsor.

Cast 

Asif Ali as Jimmy
Surya Kiran as Young Jimmy
Biju Menon as Minnal Simon
Narain as Vattathil Bosco
Abhinand as Young Vattathil Bosco
Anju Kurian as Jasmine
Merlin as Young Jasmine
Lena as Gladys
Saiju Kurup as DYSP Noble Jacob 
Balu Varghese as Karal
Sudhi Koppa as Dineshan
Benson as Aneesh
Abhishek Raveendran as Charles
Ganapathy as Sukoor
Abhijith as Kunjan
Bindu Panicker as Jimmy's Mother
Sija Rose as Lillykutty
Chithra Shenoy as Soosamma, Jasmine's Mother 
Bijukuttan as Joshy
Dinesh Prabhakar as Jimmy's Brother in law
Veena Nair as Mollykutty, Jimmy's Sister
Pradeep Kottayam as Broker Kunjose
Manoj Guinness as Ithilkanni
Sneha Paliyeri as Vineetha
Akku Melparamb as Panchayat President
Sasi Kalinga as Kannettan
Balaji Sharma as Benny
Prasanth as Shaji
Arun Mash as Thel
Alleppey Ashraf as Binukuttan
KTC Abdulla as Umbayikka
Gokulan as Pallath Balan
Tom Joseph as himself

Production 
After the success of their short film Ramaniyechiyude Namathil, Liju Thomas and Thomas Kutty ventured into making this film.  The film was shot in the picturesque area around Iritty, Kannur.  To achieve technical perfection, the creators gave detail attention to filming and editing the final climax scenes.  Five cameras were used to film the game and 5000 spectators.

Soundtrack

The original soundtrack is composed, programmed, and arranged by Jakes Bejoy and Vinu Thomas.

Release 
The film started production in April 2016. Kavi Uddheshichathu..? released on 8 October 2016 in 73 screens across Kerala.

Critical reception
Deccan Chronicle reviewer Elizabeth Thomas rated it 2.5/5 and stated: "The plot of Kavi Udeshichathu is hardly unique due to recent Karinkunnam 6'S film and it is not hard to guess the flow of events. However, the movie is not disappointing either". Nikhil of Manorama Online says it a worth watchable flick with lot of fun. He praised the direction, casting and music. Abhijith of Filmibeat.com rated it 3/5 and states: "Kavi Uddheshichathu is a decent entertainer that has its own moments".

Box office 
The film completed 50 days at the Kerala box office and went on to become an average hit.

References

External links
 

2010s Malayalam-language films
Films scored by Jakes Bejoy
Films scored by Vinu Thomas